KLOR-TV may refer to:

 KLOR-TV (defunct), defunct channel 11 in Provo, Utah which used the KLOR-TV call signs from 1958 to 1960 
 KPTV, channel 12 in Portland, Oregon, which used the KLOR-TV call signs from 1955 to 1957